Terrazoanthus onoi is a species of uncertain validity (taxon inquirendum) of macrocnemic zoanthid first found in the Galapagos. It is potentially a junior synonym of Terrazoanthus patagonichus. It can be distinguished by its bright red oral disk colour, having about 32–40 tentacles, and having only basitrichs and mastigophores present in its pharynx.

References

Further reading
Swain, Timothy D., and Laura M. Swain. "Molecular parataxonomy as taxon description: examples from recently named Zoanthidea (Cnidaria: Anthozoa) with revision based on serial histology of microanatomy." Zootaxa 3796.1 (2014): 81-107.
Bo, Marzia, et al. "Black coral assemblages from Machalilla National Park (Ecuador)." Pacific Science 66.1 (2012): 63–81.

Animals described in 2010
Hydrozoanthidae